Southern Pomo is one of seven mutually unintelligible Pomoan languages which were formerly spoken and is currently spoken by the Pomo people in Northern California along the Russian River and Clear Lake. The Pomo languages have been grouped together with other so-called Hokan languages. Southern Pomo is unique among the Pomo languages in preserving, perhaps, the greatest number of syllables inherited from Proto-Pomo (the proto-language from which all seven Pomo languages descend).

The speakers

The speakers of Southern Pomo were never a unified political group; rather, they were spread across a number of villages and spoke slightly different dialects. Southern Pomo speakers did not have a name for their language or themselves. As the southernmost of the Pomo, the speakers of the language were the first to suffer the ravages of Spanish and, later, U.S. invasion. Southern Pomo speakers were used by the Spanish to construct the last of the California missions. The damage done during the Spanish colonial period was compounded by the United States control of California. Only the northernmost populations of Southern Pomo speakers, those of the Dry Creek and Cloverdale dialects, survived to be recorded by the time linguists began to collect data on the language.

At least four modern rancherias (the California term for small Indian reservations) include members whose ancestral language was Southern Pomo: Dry Creek, Cloverdale, Lytton and Graton. In 2012 there was one fluent speaker, from Dry Creek, one rememberer, and a handful of people who learned some vocabulary as children.

Work on the language

A small amount of data was collected by early researchers such as Samuel Barrett; however, extensive work was not carried out until Abraham M. Halpern, in the 1940s, collected a number of Southern Pomo words and texts as part of a larger effort to collect data on all the Pomo languages. Halpern published one article, Southern Pomo h and ʔ and Their Reflexes, which dealt with aspects of Southern Pomo phonology. Halpern's unpublished notes are currently housed at the University of California, Berkeley. Robert L. Oswalt, who wrote a grammar of the related Kashaya (Southwestern Pomo) language, began to collect Southern Pomo data approximately twenty years after Halpern's fieldwork. Oswalt eventually published one glossed and translated text, Retribution for Mate-Stealing: A Southern Pomo Tale, as well as a number of other articles which included Southern Pomo data together with data from other Pomo languages. Though Oswalt did a large amount of work on a Southern Pomo dictionary, it has never been completed.

Phonetics and phonology
Southern Pomo has a rich sound system with aspirated, unaspirated, ejective and voiced stops. It has a total of 28 consonants (plus the pseudo-consonant ). The vowel system, in contrast, contains only five qualities: . All phonemes, both consonants and vowels, can occur long. The full consonant inventory is laid out below.

Consonants

Language revitalization efforts 
In 2011 the Dry Creek Rancheria Band of Pomo Indians hired Dr. Neil Alexander Walker to develop a language restoration program for Southern Pomo, one that is currently active and includes classes, a mobile application, signage placed on ancestral lands, summer youth day camps focused on traditional Pomo foods, and aids such as posters and coloring books. As of 2012, fewer than three first-language speakers are known to survive, none younger than 90. There is currently a core group of heritage speakers from several tribes who are seriously involved in learning the language. 

As of 2021 there are two Southern Pomo apps available. One called Learn Southern Pomo Alphabet and another one called Southern Pomo Language Intro.

See also
 Elsie Allen

References

External links
Southern Pomo Language Project at the Western Institute for Endangered Language Documentation
Southern Pomo language overview at the Survey of California and Other Indian Languages
Resources in and about the Southern Pomo language
Southern Pomo, California Language Archives
OLAC resources in and about the Southern Pomo language
Southern Pomo at the California Language Archive

Indigenous languages of California
Pomoan languages
Endangered indigenous languages of the Americas
Native American language revitalization